Revenue stamps of Ireland refer to the various revenue or fiscal stamps, whether adhesive, directly embossed or otherwise,  which have been used on the island of Ireland since 1774. These include issues by the Kingdom of Ireland, issues by the United Kingdom specifically for use in Ireland or briefly Southern Ireland, and issues of an independent southern Ireland since 1922 (including the Provisional Government of Ireland, the Irish Free State and the Republic of Ireland). Revenue stamps of Northern Ireland were also issued from 1921 to the 1980s, but they are not covered in this article.

Union with Britain

In the 18th century, Ireland was an independent kingdom in personal union with and a de facto client state of the Kingdom of Great Britain, and in 1801 both kingdoms were merged into the United Kingdom of Great Britain and Ireland. During this period, some revenue stamps of the United Kingdom – both directly embossed or adhesive – were used in Ireland. However, since the island had many unique branches of the legal system, it required its own revenue stamps for some uses.

The first revenue stamps specifically for use in Ireland were impressed duty stamps introduced in 1774 to pay for stamp duty. Like British issues, the stamps could be embossed directly onto a document or on pieces of coloured paper with a cypher label at the back. Initially, colourless embossing was used although later on coloured ink was also used. Embossed adhesives were introduced in 1858, and these were either inscribed IRELAND or were regular British issues but with die letters which were exclusively used in Ireland only.

Apart from general duty stamps, there were also directly embossed revenue stamps for Affidavit, Bankers Note or Bill, Bonds, Chancery Fee Fund, Civil Bill Duty, the Court of Bankruptcy and Insolvency, Enrolment, Intermediate Education, Judgements Registry, Law Fund, Lease, Lunacy Fee, Protests, Record of Titles, Registration of Deeds, the Supreme Court of Judicature, and Writ. Embossed adhesives were also used for Admiralty Court, Chancery Fee Fund, Petty Sessions and Registration of Deeds.

British key types specifically inscribed for use in Ireland were first issued in 1873, a year after key types were introduced in Britain. These depicted the reigning monarch, initially Queen Victoria and later King Edward VII and King George V, and they remained in use until the partition of Ireland. Key types were issued for Bankruptcy, County Courts, Judicature, Land Commission, Land Registry, Petty Sessions (some of which were overprinted for Dog Licence Registration), Records, Registration of Deeds, Registration of Title and Registration of Title Insurance Fund.

British Admiralty Court, Chancery Court and Judicature stamps were also overprinted for use in Ireland. In addition, specific designs depicting Queen Victoria were also used for Admiralty Court, Chancery Fee Fund, Petty Sessions, Record of Titles and Registration of Deeds. Dog licence stamps depicting an Irish Wolfhound were introduced in 1865 and remained in use until partition.

Following partition, the following George V key types were issued for Southern Ireland in 1921–22: Civil Service, Companies Registration, Contract Note, County Courts, Estate Duty, Foreign Bill, Judicature, Land Registry, Official Arbitration and Petty Sessions. At this point, revenue stamps of Northern Ireland were also introduced, and these continued to be issued until the late 20th century.

Irish Free State and Republic

Following the Irish War of Independence, Ireland was partitioned and in 1922, the southern part fell under the administration of the Provisional Government of Ireland. Various revenue stamps, either Irish issues as described above or regular British issues, were therefore overprinted accordingly. Rialtas overprints can therefore be found on Bankruptcy, Civil Service, Companies Registration, Contract Note, County Courts, Dog Licence Registration, Excise, Foreign Bill, Health & Pensions Insurance, Judicature, Land Registry, National Health Insurance, Official Arbitration, Petty Sessions, Records, Registration of Deeds and Unemployment Insurance stamps.

The Irish Free State was established at the end of 1922, and British or Irish revenues were once again similarly overprinted. Saorstát overprints may be found on Contract Note, County Courts, Dog Licence Registration, Estate Duty, Excise, Foreign Bill, Judicature, Land Commission, Land Registry, National Health Insurance, Petty Sessions, Public Records, Registration of Deeds and Unemployment Insurance stamps.

The Southern Ireland issues and the Rialtas and Saorstát overprints include some of Ireland's rarest revenues. For example, only one copy has been recorded of the 6d Dog Licence Registration stamp with the Rialtas overprint.

Key type stamps depicting the Celtic harp, a national symbol of Ireland, were introduced in 1925, and these were issued for Bankruptcy, Circuit Court, Companies Registration, Consular Service, Contract Note, Court of Justice, Customs, District Court of Justice, Estate Duty, Film Censorship, Foreign Bill, Judicature, Land Commission, Land Registry, Official Arbitration, Passport, Public Records, Registration of Deeds and State Service. Some key types had inscriptions in both Irish and English, with others being inscribed solely in Irish. Some remained in use after decimalization in 1971, with the last stamps being issued in the 1980s.

Another design featuring the harp, but smaller than the regular key types was also used for Customs Entry Duty, Customs Late Fee and Old Age Pensions between 1924 and the 1960s. Ireland also issued embossed adhesives in the 1920s, and continued to use impressed duty stamps for a number of decades after independence. A postage stamp was also overprinted for use as a Passport stamp in around 1930. Apart from these, stamps with specific designs were also used for Animal Slaughter fees, Children's Allowance, Excise, Exported Livestock Levy, Income Tax, National Insurance and Unemployment Insurance. Excise stamps have been issued for various purposes, including entertainments taxes and taxes on cigarettes, and stamps for the latter are still in use today.

See also
Revenue stamps of the United Kingdom
Revenue stamps of Northern Ireland
Postage stamps of Ireland

References

Bibliography

Brady, James J. (1973). Adhesive Revenue Stamps of Ireland 1858–1925.
Feldman, David ( 1975). Revenue Stamps of Ireland.

External links

Ireland Revenue Stamp Archive and Republic of Ireland Revenue Archive – gallery of various Irish revenue stamps by I.B RedGuy's Fine Stamps

Taxation in Ireland
Philately of Ireland
Ireland
1774 establishments in Ireland